Michel Vermeulin (born 6 September 1934) is a former road and track cyclist from France, who won the gold medal in the men's team road race at the 1956 Summer Olympics in Melbourne, Australia, alongside Arnaud Geyre and Maurice Moucheraud. He also won the silver medal in the men's 4.000m team pursuit in the track competition in Melbourne, Australia. Vermeulin was a professional rider from 1958 to 1964.

Major results

1956
Gold Medal team time trial at Summer Olympics
1958
Aurillac
Circuit de la Vienne
1959
Trofeo Longines (with Jacques Anquetil, André Darrigade, Seamus Elliott and Jean Graczyk)
Tour de France:
Wearing yellow jersey for three days
1960
Grand Prix de Fourmies

References

External links 
 
 Official Tour de France results for Michel Vermeulin

1934 births
Living people
French male cyclists
French track cyclists
Cyclists at the 1956 Summer Olympics
Olympic cyclists of France
Olympic gold medalists for France
Olympic silver medalists for France
Cyclists from Paris
Olympic medalists in cycling
Medalists at the 1956 Summer Olympics